Cyperus usitatus is a species of sedge that is native to southern parts of Africa.

See also 
 List of Cyperus species

References 

usitatus
Plants described in 1824
Flora of Angola
Flora of Botswana
Flora of South Africa
Flora of Ethiopia
Flora of Kenya
Flora of Namibia
Flora of Tanzania
Flora of Uganda
Flora of Zambia
Taxa named by William John Burchell